Legislative elections were held in Russia on 18 September 2016. On 10 June 2017 Vladimir Zhutenkov resigned. On 14 June, the Central Election Commission scheduled a by-election in the Bryansk constituency for 10 September 2017.

2016 result

Candidates

Registered
Candidates on the ballot:
Party of Growth: Sergey Gorelov, businessman, 2016 candidate for State Duma in the Unecha constituency (Bryansk Oblast)
Rodina: Nikolay Alekseyenko, businessman
Communists of Russia: Sergey Malinkovich, deputy of Smolninskoye Municipal Okrug Assembly (Saint Petersburg), 2016 candidate for State Duma
Communist Party: Aleksandr Kupriyanov, secretary of ideology of CPRF Bryansk regional office
Liberal Democratic Party: Boris Paykin, billionaire, partner at Fort Group, 2016 candidate for State Duma in the Central constituency (Saint Petersburg)
Patriots of Russia: Konstantin Kasaminsky, Deputy Head of Administration of Karachevsky District
Yabloko: Olga Matokhina, local activist, 2016 candidate for State Duma in the Unecha constituency (Bryansk Oblast)
Party of Pensioners: Vladimir Vorozhtsov, former First Deputy Director of Federal Tax Police Service (2000-2002), 2016 candidate for State Duma
A Just Russia: Sergey Kurdenko, deputy of Klimovo Council of People's Deputies, 2016 candidate for State Duma for this seat

Denied registration
Great Fatherland Party: Nikolay Starikov, writer, leader of Great Fatherland Party

Withdrew
Independent: Nikolay Burbyga, former Chief Federal Inspector for Bryansk Oblast
Independent: Andrey Novikov, Bryansk City Council of People's Deputies staffer

Declined
United Russia: Aleksandr Khinshtein, former member of State Duma (2003-2016)
United Russia: Viktor Malashenko, former member of State Duma (2006-2011, 2014-2016)
Communist Party: Pyotr Romanov, former member of State Duma (1995-2016)

Result

|-
! colspan=2 style="background-color:#E9E9E9;text-align:left;vertical-align:top;" |Candidate
! style="background-color:#E9E9E9;text-align:left;vertical-align:top;" |Party
! style="background-color:#E9E9E9;text-align:right;" |Votes
! style="background-color:#E9E9E9;text-align:right;" |%
|-
|style="background-color: " |
|Boris Paykin
|Liberal Democratic Party
|93,794
|52.0%
|-
|style="background-color: #0047AB" |
|Sergey Gorelov
|Party of Growth
|17,120
|9.5%
|-
|style="background-color: " |
|Alexander Kupriyanov
|Communist Party
|16,911
|9.3%
|-
|style="background-color: " |
|Sergey Kurdenko
|A Just Russia
|11,123
|6.2%
|-
|style="background: #1E90FF;"| 
|Vladimir Vorozhtsov
|Party of Pensioners
|8,814	
|4.9%
|-
|style="background-color: " |
|Konstantin Kasaminsky
|Patriots of Russia
|6,928		
|3.8%
|-
|style="background-color: " |
|Olga Matokhina
|Yabloko
|6,746			
|3.7%
|-
|style="background: #E62020;"| 
|Sergey Malinkovich
|Communists of Russia
|6,159		
|3.4%
|-
|style="background-color: " |
|Nikolay Alexeyenko
|Rodina
|4,890	
|2.7%
|-
| colspan="5" style="background-color:#E9E9E9;"|
|- style="font-weight:bold"
| colspan="3" style="text-align:left;" | Total
| 172,485
| 100%
|-
| colspan="5" style="background-color:#E9E9E9;"|
|- style="font-weight:bold"
| colspan="4" |Source:
|
|}

External links
CEC Russia

References

2017
2017 elections in Russia
7th State Duma of the Russian Federation
By-elections to the 7th Russian State Duma